Kingswood Music Theatre is a 15,000-seat amphitheatre located at Canada's Wonderland in Vaughan, Ontario. Kingswood is open from May to September. The facility opened in 1983.

Kingswood is an open-air theater with a covered bandshell and exposed lawn seats for the audience.

On August 18, 1986, the reunion of Canadian folk duo Ian & Sylvia was filmed at Kingswood by CBC Television, with guests Gordon Lightfoot, Judy Collins, Emmylou Harris and Murray McLachlan.

After the Molson Amphitheatre opened in 1995 and Air Canada Centre opened in 1999 the use of Kingswood as a music venue declined. Cultural festivals at the theatre became more prominent. The box office at the gates of Wonderland was removed because of the decline of the theatre as a music venue.

Many notable artists and bands have played the concert venue, including Harry Belafonte, Johnny Mathis, Eric Clapton, John Denver, Bette Midler, Donna Summer, Laura Branigan, David Lee Roth, Grateful Dead, The Fugees, Cypress Hill, A Tribe Called Quest, Busta Rhymes, Simple Minds & The Smiths.

Canadian rock musician Kim Mitchell, won an award for ticket sales of over 100,000 tickets for his performances at the venue.

Other notable artists and bands having played the concert venue include:

 April Wine, Animotion, Arlo Guthrie, Aerosmith, Aldo Nova, Asia & America
 B-52's, Book Of Love, Bow Wow Wow, Bullett Boys, Barney Bentall & The Legendary Hearts, Belinda Carlisle, Barry Manilow, Big Country, Billy Bragg, B.B. King, Barenaked Ladies, Bryan Adams, Burton Cummings & Bob Dylan, Bad Company
 Chicago, Chalk Circle, Crowded House, China Crisis, Cinderella, Corey Hart, Crosby Stills & Nash, Cracker, Culture Club & Conway Twitty
 Duran Duran, Depeche Mode, Damn Yankees, Debbie Gibson, Don Henley, Deborah Harry & Duke Jupiter
 Erasure, Extreme, Eurythmics & Elvis Costello
 Foreigner, Firehouse, Fine Young Cannibals & Fleetwood Mac
 Glass Tiger, George Thorogood & The Destroyers, Gowan, Georgia Satellites, Gang Of Four, George Clinton & The P-Funk All Stars & George Benson
 Hall & Oates, Huey Lewis & The News, Heart, Honeymoon Suite, Haywire, Howard Jones, Harlequin & Herb Alpert & The Tijuana Brass
 INXS, Iggy Pop & Iron Maiden
 Joe Walsh, Jackson Browne, Julian Lennon & Jimmy Buffett
 Kenny Loggins, Kool & The Gang & Korn
 Little Feat, Lou Reed, Lynyrd Skynyrd, Linda Ronstadt, Little River Band & Lou Rawls
 Morrissey, Martha & The Muffins, Midnight Oil, Mr. Big, Men Without Hats & Melissa Manchester, Mike & The Mechanics
 Night Ranger, Neil Young & New Order
 Orbital & Orion The Hunter
 Poison, Public Enemy, Pete Seeger, Platinum Blonde, Peter Murphy, Procol Harum, Peter Paul & Mary & Paul Anka
 Roger Waters, Roger Daltrey & Red Rider
 Squeeze, Santana, Souxsie & The Banshees, Sisters Of Mercy, Scorpions, Slaughter, Smithereens, Sting, Stevie Nicks, Stevie Ray Vaughan, Steve Earle & The Dukes, Steve Miller Band, Screaming Trees, Soul Asylum, Shirley Bassey, Skillet, Santers & Sherry Kean
 The Go-Go's, Talk Talk, The Replacements, Terence Trent D'Arby, Tom Petty & The Heartbreakers, The English Beat, The Spoons, The Turtles, The Psychedelic Furs, Triumph, Teenage Head, The Band, The Pretenders, Talking Heads, The Cure, The Pogues, The Ramones, Tool, The Beach Boys, The Moody Blues, Trixter, The Kinks, The Bangles, The Rainmakers, The Fixx, The Tenants, The Stray Cats, The Hooters, Tracy Chapman, Tina Turner, Traffic, The Roots, The Allman Brothers, 10,000 Maniacs, The Osmonds, The Hollies, Tony Casey, The Kings & The Tubes
 UB40
 Violent Femmes & Van Morrison
 Warrior Soul, World Party, Warrant & Winger
 ZZ Top

References
2. https://www.ajournalofmusicalthings.com/remembering-kingswood-music-theatre/

4. https://www.concertarchives.org/venues/kingswood-music-theatre

Buildings and structures in Vaughan
Amphitheatres in Canada
Cedar Fair attractions